Express was the name of a number of steamships, including:

, a London and South Western Railway ship
, a Waxholmsbolaget ship
, an American Export Lines ship

Ship names